Kleine Steinau is a river of Lower Saxony, Germany. It is a  tributary of the Sieber, north of Herzberg am Harz in the district of Göttingen.

It initially flows in a westerly direction, but later swings south before emptying into the River Sieber near the small settlement of Aschenhütte, not far from the mouth of the Große Steinau. In the upper reaches of the Kleine Steinau it is also called the Schindelgraben, although it is not clear from the maps at which point the name changes.

See also 
List of rivers of Lower Saxony

References

Sources 
Topographische Karte 1:25000, Nr. 4228 Riefensbeek
Topographische Karte 1:25000, Nr. 4227 Osterode im Harz
Topographische Karte 1:25000, Nr. 4327 Gieboldehausen

Rivers of Lower Saxony
Rivers of the Harz
Göttingen (district)
Rivers of Germany